Svetlana Valentinovna Goncharenko (born May 28, 1971 in Rostov-on-Don as Svetlana Doronina) is a former Russian athlete who mainly competed in the 200 metres. In addition to winning medals in individual contests, she has been a very successful relay runner, winning the bronze medal in 4 × 400 metres relay at the 2000 Olympics.

Personal bests
100 metres - 11.13 (1998)
200 metres - 22.46 (1998)
400 metres - 50.23 (2000)

International competitions

References

1971 births
Living people
Sportspeople from Rostov-on-Don
Russian female sprinters
Olympic female sprinters
Olympic athletes of Russia
Olympic bronze medalists for Russia
Olympic bronze medalists in athletics (track and field)
Athletes (track and field) at the 1996 Summer Olympics
Athletes (track and field) at the 2000 Summer Olympics
Medalists at the 2000 Summer Olympics
Universiade gold medalists in athletics (track and field)
Universiade gold medalists for Russia
Medalists at the 1997 Summer Universiade
World Athletics Championships athletes for Russia
World Athletics Championships medalists
World Athletics Championships winners
World Athletics Indoor Championships medalists
World Athletics Indoor Championships winners
European Athletics Championships medalists
European Athletics Indoor Championships winners
Russian Athletics Championships winners
World record setters in athletics (track and field)